Triggella is a genus of jumping spiders first described in 2015. , it contains only three species.

References

Salticidae
Salticidae genera
Spiders of Central America
Spiders of South America